Karl E. Landler is a French actor, filmmaker who stars in French and American TV shows and films. He joined the international cast of the Sci-Fi TV series Métal Hurlant Chronicles. He is the face of numerous worldwide campaigns such as Shiseido by Jean Paul Goude and Red Steel 2 for Ubisoft. Karl is also a FreeRunner Parkour and stuntman who worked many times with Luc Besson.

Career

Feature films 
He worked twice with Jean Marc Barr and Pascal Arnold.

In 2014, he co-starred in the American-French indie movie Layover with American actress Nathalie Fay directed by Joshua Caldwell. Layover premiered at Seattle international Film Festival (SIFF).

TV 

In 2021 He Stars as "Lucas Bodin" on the American romantic Christmas movie "A Christmas in Paris"  along side Daphne zuniga and Rebecca Dalton. The movie has been distributed all over Europe and North America. 

In 2016, Karl joined the cast of the french romantic comedie Une Famille Formidable which is the longest french TV show ever produced on the main network TF1. He played Bruno Viguier a member of the main family. His character come back after 15 years of absence. E. Landler join the show at the end of the 13 season. Series regular.

In 2014, Karl joined the international cast of the Syfy TV show Métal Hurlant Chronicles sold in over 100 countries. He plays the lead in "Loyal Khondor"; A loyal warrior, Khondor, seeks an elixir to cure his beloved princess from the dreaded "cold disease" alongside Scott Adkins, John Rhys Davies and Marem Hassler, and stars as well in "Second son"; "Two brothers battle for control of a kingdom with unique values about life and death" alongside Frédérique Bel and Dominique Pinon.

He played Robin Torrens, the killer, in the award-winning TV Show , in a two episodes prime time special for the French main network TF1. It was watched by over 6.9M when it premiered.

Karl portrayed  "Lt Adrien Fontel", a former G.I with the Capgras Syndrome disorder in the TV show Profilage. It opened the new season with more than 7.7 M viewers, which was considered as the highest opening for the show. The episode, "Panic" was in the official competition and won Best TV drama at the number one French International TV festival, La Rochelle.

In France, He played in many of the most successful French TV shows with some of his episodes establishing prime time records and gathering awards.

He is the lead of the TV movie , produced by the main French network TF1. Karl played Virgil, an undercover cop in a mafia unit.

Campaign 
E. Landler is the face of LAFUMA well known as an outdoor clothing brand.

Karl's acrobatic skills bring him on to represent Shiseido in a worldwide print and video campaign shot and created by Jean Paul Goude (Coco Chanel, ...).

Karl was starring in the award-winning campaign for the french army which premiered in theatre before James Bond: Casino Royal and has been aired for three years on TV and theatre before blockbusters such as Pirates of the Caraibean. His co-star is the César award (French Oscar)-winning actress Zita Hanrot.

Music video 
He played the boyfriend of the NRJ's award winner singer Amel Bent in her music video Je reste. it peaked as number one on the Belgian Singles Chart.

Director 
He co-wrote, directed and starred in the short film DuO alongside Marem Hassler his co-star in Metal Hurlant Chronicles. DuO won best comedy and best actress and got nominated for best actor and best director at Los Angeles Independent Films festival.

Trivia 
He was honored at the first Chinese Oscars in Hollywood, Huading Awards.

References

External links
 
 
 
 
 

21st-century French male actors
French male film actors
French male television actors
Living people
Place of birth missing (living people)
Year of birth missing (living people)
French filmmakers